Williams Township is a township in Benton County, in the U.S. state of Missouri.

Williams Township was formed in February 1835, taking its name from Ezekiel Williams, a pioneer settler.

References

Townships in Missouri
Townships in Benton County, Missouri